In United States Constitutional Law, intergovernmental immunity is a doctrine that prevents the federal government and individual state governments from intruding on each other's sovereignty. It is also referred to as a Supremacy Clause immunity or simply federal immunity from state law.

The doctrine was established by the United States Supreme Court in McCulloch v. Maryland (1819), which ruled unanimously that states may not regulate property or operations of the federal government. In that case, Maryland state law subjected banks not chartered by the state to restrictions and taxes. In McCullochs case, state law had attempted to impose these restrictions on the Second Bank of the United States. The Court found that if a state had the power to tax a federally incorporated institution, then the state effectively had the power to destroy the federal institution, thereby thwarting the intent and purpose of Congress. This would make the states superior to the federal government.

Federal pension exemption from state tax 

In , the U.S. Supreme Court ruled that state governments may not tax federal pensions if they exempt their own state pensions from taxation.  However, they may choose to subject both federal and state pensions to taxation, as the federal government waived its immunity in the Public Salary Tax Act (1939), .  They may also tax pensions of other states.  For example, Michigan exempts federal, Michigan state, and Michigan municipal pensions from taxation.

Traffic and parking violations

In some cases, the federal government may voluntarily subject itself to local regulations.  For example, the policy of the General Services Administration is that federal employees must obey state and local laws "except when the duties of your position require otherwise", and are personally responsible for paying parking fines and moving violation fines not required for official purposes.  A 2008 Congressional report found the federal government's lack of effective enforcement of this policy was creating traffic hazards in Washington, D.C., and New York City.

See also
 States' rights
 Supremacy Clause

References

External links
HeinOnline: 112 Yale L.J. 2195 (2002-2003) What Kind of Immunity - Federal Officers, State Criminal Law, and the Supremacy Clause; Waxman, Seth P.; Morrison, Trevor W.
Google Books: Excerpt from "The Supremacy Clause: A Reference Guide to the United States Constitution" by Christopher R. Drahozal

United States constitutional law